Abasolo is a city and seat of the municipality of Abasolo in the northern Mexican state of Coahuila. In 2000, the city had 1,130 inhabitants.

History
In 1730 it went by the name of Vicente el Alto, by November 14, 1827, it was granted village status and renamed after Independence caudillo Mariano Abasolo.

Coat of arms

Over a parchment appears the image of an eagle with its wings extended as a frame separated into three sections. In the upper right section the San Vicente Ferrer church is shown. A lit torch symbolizes the free spirit of its inhabitants in the upper left section. Finally in the lower section, prosperity and modernity are depicted in which a tractor driver works the land irrigated by a brook. In the background mountains and trees are seen. The inscription at the top of the parchment reads "Terra Mater", which emphasizes the importance of the land to its inhabitants.

Climate

References

External links
Municipal information on Coahuila state website (in Spanish)
Official webpage (in Spanish)

Populated places in Coahuila
1827 establishments in Mexico
Populated places established in 1827